The Pietà is a subject in Christian art depicting the Virgin Mary cradling the dead body of Jesus.

Pietà or Pieta may also refer to:

Works of art
 Pietà (Southern German, Cloisters), a German wooden sculpture
 Pietà (Michelangelo), a marble sculpture
 Pietà (Titian), a painting by Titian
 Pietà (Filippo Lippi, Florence), a 1430–1435 painting by Filippo Lippi
 Pietà (Annibale Carracci), a c.1600 oil on canvas painting by Annibale Carracci
 Pietà (Bellini, Milan), a c.1455-1460 tempera on panel painting by Giovanni Bellini
 Pietà (El Greco), a 1571-1576 painting by El Greco
 Pietà (Lotto), a 1545 oil on canvas painting by Lorenzo Lotto,
 Pietà (Ribera, 1637), a 1637 painting by Jusepe de Ribera
  Pietà (Flandrin), a c. 1842 painting by Hippolyte  Flandrin

Other uses
 Pietà (manga), a 1998 Japanese josei manga
 Pieta (TV series), a Philippine TV series
 Pietà (film), a 2012 South Korean film
 Pieta (1987 film), an Australian television film
 Pietà (book), a 1989 book by George Klein
 Pieta Brown (born 1973), American musician.

Locations 

 Pieta, California
 Pietà, Malta

See also
 della Pietà, a surname
 Ospedale della Pietà, an orphanage and music school
 Pieta House, a suicide prevention charity in Ireland
 Pieta prayer booklet, a Catholic prayer book approved by Pope Pius IX
 Santa Maria della Pietà, Venice, a church